Derrek Dickey (March 20, 1951 – June 25, 2002) was an American professional basketball player and sportscaster.

Dickey was born in Cincinnati, the son of John and Ola Dickey. A 6'7" forward, Dickey starred at Purcell High School (now Purcell Marian High School) in Cincinnati, where he led the city in scoring in 1968–69. He earned first-team All-Ohio honors.

He played basketball at the University of Cincinnati for three varsity seasons (1970–71 through 1972–73; freshmen were not eligible in 1969–70). For his college career, he averaged 17.0 points and 11.0 rebounds per game.

He led the team in rebounding all three seasons with averages of 12.1, 10.9 and 10.0, and he led once in scoring with 17.9 points per game, as a sophomore. He was a team captain both his junior and senior years. The Bearcats had a record of 48–30 during his three seasons.

Dickey was selected by the Golden State Warriors in the second round of the 1973 NBA Draft. Dickey played five seasons in the NBA with the Warriors and the Chicago Bulls, averaging 6.1 points per game and 4.9 rebounds per game. He was a key contributor on the 1975 Warriors team that won the NBA Championship during which Dickey set personal bests of 23.2 minutes per game, 7.7 points, 6.9 rebounds, and 1.6 assists. His field goal percentage was .482.

After his playing career ended, Dickey served as a color commentator on telecasts of University of Cincinnati basketball games. He also held stints as an analyst for the Sacramento Kings and the Chicago Bulls as well as ESPN.

In 1988, he was inducted into the University of Cincinnati Athletic Hall of Fame.

Dickey suffered a stroke in 1997 and lost the use of his left arm and leg. Through rehabilitation, he regained his ability to walk and resumed his broadcasting duties. He also became a volunteer for the American Heart Association.

In 2002, Dickey died of heart failure at his home in Sacramento. He was survived by his wife, Sally (Simonds), whom he married in 1998; two sons, Derrek Jr. and David; a daughter, Dana; his father, John; a sister, Debbie Dickey-Gilbert; and three grandchildren.

References

1951 births
2002 deaths
African-American basketball players
American men's basketball players
Basketball players from Cincinnati
Chicago Bulls players
Chicago Bulls announcers
Cincinnati Bearcats men's basketball players
College basketball announcers in the United States
Golden State Warriors draft picks
Golden State Warriors players
National Basketball Association broadcasters
Sacramento Kings announcers
Small forwards
20th-century African-American sportspeople
21st-century African-American people